is a passenger railway station located in the city of Machida, Tokyo, Japan, operated by Tokyu Corporation.

Lines

Only "Local" and "Semi-express" services stop at this station.

Station layout
The station has two opposed ground-level side platforms serving two tracks, connected by an underground passage.

Platforms

History
Suzukakedai Station opened on 1 April 1972.

Passenger statistics
In fiscal 2019, the station was used by an average of 11,623 passengers daily.

The passenger figures for previous years are as shown below.

Surrounding area
 Tokyo Institute of Technology Suzukakedai campus
 Machida Tsukushino Junior High School

See also
List of railway stations in Japan

References

External links

 Suzukakedai Station information (Tokyu) 

Railway stations in Japan opened in 1972
Tokyu Den-en-toshi Line
Stations of Tokyu Corporation
Railway stations in Tokyo
Machida, Tokyo